Skradnik  is a village in Croatia. 

Populated places in Karlovac County